Kirkintilloch railway station served part of Kirkintilloch in Scotland. The station was constructed by the Edinburgh and Glasgow Railway, which became part of the North British Railway.

History
Opened by the Edinburgh and Glasgow Railway in 1848, the station passed to the North British Railway in 1858, the London and North Eastern Railway in the 1923 Grouping, and then to the Scottish Region of British Railways on nationalisation in 1948. It was then closed by the British Railways Board in September 1964.

The site today

References

Notes

Sources 

Disused railway stations in East Dunbartonshire
Railway stations in Great Britain opened in 1848
Railway stations in Great Britain closed in 1964
Former North British Railway stations
Beeching closures in Scotland
Kirkintilloch